Peter Murphy (born 7 November 1961 in Loughrea, County Galway) is an Irish former sportsperson. He played hurling with his local club Loughrea and was a member of the Galway senior inter-county team in the 1980s.

References

1961 births
Living people
Loughrea hurlers
Galway inter-county hurlers
Connacht inter-provincial hurlers